Dunkel, German for "dark", is a group of German lager styles.

Dunkel or Dunkle may also refer to:

People
 Arthur Dunkel, (1932–2005), Swiss politician, Director-General of the World Trade Organization (1980–1993)
 Curtis Dunkel, American psychologist
 Dieter Dunkel, German boxer
 Fred Dunkel (1891–1948), German journalist, businessman, and filmmaker
 Harry F. Dunkel (1898–1990), American lawyer and politician
 John Dunkel (1915–2001), American screenwriter
 Nancy Dunkel (born 1955), American politician
 Paul Lustig Dunkel (1943–2018), American flutist and conductor
 Uwe Dünkel (born 1960), German Olympic racewalker
 William Dunkel (1893–1980), American-born Swiss architect and painter

Places
 Dunkel, Illinois, an unincorporated community in Christian County

Other uses
 Dunkel System, a rating system for American college football teams

See also
 Dunkels